Kiiova is a village in Setomaa Parish, Võru County, Estonia.

References

Villages in Võru County